Gorzyce  is a village and the seat of Gmina Gorzyce in Wodzisław County, Silesian Voivodeship, Poland. It has a population of 2,487.

History
The village was first mentioned in the document of Pope Gregory IX issued on 26 May 1229 among villages belonging to Benedictine abbey in Tyniec, as maiori Gorzice. Benedictine abbey in Orlová (established in 1268) in the late 13th century had rights to revenues from three villages in the Castellany of Racibórz, namely Gorzyce, Uchylsko and Gołkowice.

The village was annexed by the Kingdom of Prussia in 1742 after the First Silesian War. As Groß Gorschütz, it became part of the German Empire in 1871 and was ceded to the Second Polish Republic after World War I.

During World War II, Gorzyce was the location of the Polenlager 168, a Nazi concentration camp of Polenlager type, i.e., primarily for Poles. The building of the transport depot at Leśna street, Gorzyce, holds a memorial plaque. The collective grave of the inmates is at the cemetery at Gorzyce.

People
 Georg von Arco (1869–1940), radio pioneer

References

External links 
  Official Gmina Gorzyce website

Villages in Wodzisław County